Philip Rasmussen (born 12 January 1989) is a Danish professional footballer who plays as a midfielder.

Career

Danish career
Rasmussen played in the Lyngby BK academy system untl 2008 when he signed with Nordsjaelland, appearing in 22 matches between 2008 and 2010. He appeared in four tournament matches for the teams eventual 2010 Danish Cup win. Between 2010 and 2013 Rasmussen played matches with FC Vestsjaelland and Viborg in either the Danish Superliga or Danish 1st Division.

Lyngby BK
Rasmussen joined Lyngby BK in 2013 and would go on to play four years with the team, appearing in 101 Danish Superliga matches. Between 2008 and 2017 he appeared in 154 matches logged nearly 10,000 minutes of play and scored nine goals.

USL
Rasmussen moved to Oklahoma City Energy FC of the USL Championship in 2017, He appeared in 14 matches with the team during the 2017 season. In 2018 he appeared in 25 games and tied his single season high in goals with three.

In 2019 Rasmussen signed with Hartford Athletic, joining former Head coach Jimmy Nelson who had recruited several former OKC Energy FC players and Danish soccer players to the new club, including Sebastian Dalgaard, Mads Jørgensen and Frederik Due. Both Rasmussen and Nelson would depart Hartford after the 2019 season.

FC Roskilde
On 26 February 2020 it was confirmed, that Rasmussen had joined Danish Superliga club FC Roskilde. He remained with the team after their relegation to Danish 1st Division for the 2020-2021 season. He left the club at the end of the 2020-21 season, when his contract expired.

References

External links
Official Danish Superliga stats
USLC bio

Living people
1989 births
Danish men's footballers
Footballers from Copenhagen
Association football midfielders
FC Nordsjælland players
Viborg FF players
FC Vestsjælland players
Lyngby Boldklub players
OKC Energy FC players
Hartford Athletic players
FC Roskilde players
Danish Superliga players
Danish 1st Division players
USL Championship players
Denmark under-21 international footballers
Danish expatriate men's footballers
Expatriate soccer players in the United States
Danish expatriate sportspeople in the United States